Ivan Stepanovsky (born c. 1710 — died in Saint Petersburg) was a Ukrainian lutenist.

Biography
Stepanovsky was born in c. 1710. In 1740-ies studied lute with Sylvius Leopold Weiss in Dresden. Served as a lutenist by the courts of prince-elector Augustus II the Strong (Dresden), Polish King (Warsaw). Since 1946 was a court musician in Saint Petersburg.

References
 Українська радянська енциклопедія : у 12 т. / гол. ред. М. П. Бажан ; редкол.: О. К. Антонов та ін. — 2-ге вид. — К. : Головна редакція УРЕ, 1974–1985.
 Митці України : Енциклопедичний довідник / упоряд. : М. Г. Лабінський, В. С. Мурза ; за ред. А. В. Кудрицького. — К. : «Українська енциклопедія» ім. М. П. Бажана, 1992. — С. 554. — ISBN 5-88500-042-5.

1710s births
Ukrainian classical musicians
Ukrainian lutenists
Ukrainian people in the Russian Empire
18th-century male musicians